Ralph Taylor (3 June 1915 – 20 June 2012) was an  Australian rules footballer who played with Hawthorn in the Victorian Football League (VFL).

Notes

External links 

1915 births
2012 deaths
Australian rules footballers from Victoria (Australia)
Hawthorn Football Club players